John Gray ( – September 13, 1829), a Canadian banker, JP and militia officer, was the founder and first president of the Bank of Montreal.

Born in England around 1755, Gray arrived in Canada around 1781 as a fur trader. Gray later became an attorney, a trustee and executor of wills and estates, as well as an agent for the British treasury.

In 1817, Gray with 12 other Montreal merchants founded the Bank of Montreal and became the bank's first president.

Gray died in Côte-Sainte-Catherine in 1829.

References
 

Pre-Confederation Canadian businesspeople
Bank of Montreal presidents
Anglophone Quebec people
English emigrants to pre-Confederation Quebec
1755 births
1829 deaths
Year of birth unknown